Dublin Mosque is a mosque on the South Circular Road, Dublin in Ireland. It is the headquarters of the Islamic Foundation of Ireland.

The Donore Presbyterian Church was constructed in the 1860s in the style of a 13th-century English church.
In 1983 the building on the South Circular Road was bought by the Islamic Foundation of Ireland and converted into a mosque.

See also
Islam in Ireland

References

External links

Islamic Foundation of Ireland official website
Information about the mosque

1976 establishments in Ireland
Islamic organizations established in 1976
Mosques converted from churches in Europe
Mosques in the Republic of Ireland
Religious buildings and structures in Dublin (city)